Vice Admiral William Douglas Crowder (born 1952) retired from the United States Navy in November 2009 after serving as the Deputy Chief of Naval Operations for Operations, Plans and Strategy (N3/N5).  Crowder was the 45th commander of the United States 7th Fleet.

Career
The son of a navy master chief and quartermaster, Crowder received a congressional appointment to the United States Naval Academy, where he graduated in June 1974.

He commanded  from 1992–1994, operating in both the Pacific and Atlantic, winning the Battle Efficiency "E" Award. In 1998-1999 he commanded Destroyer Squadron 24, deploying to the Mediterranean as part of the USS John F. Kennedy Battle Group. He also served as the aide and flag lieutenant to Commander, Naval Surface Forces Atlantic.

Ashore, Crowder has served a number of tours in the Pentagon including: as action officer on the staff of the Chief of Naval Operations, Strategy and Plans Division (OP-60); Surface Warfare Analyst in the Office of Program Appraisal (Office of Secretary of the Navy); Deputy Executive Assistant to the Vice Chief of Naval Operations; Chief of the Planning and Integration Branch, Joint Staff (J-8); Senior Staff of the National Defense Panel; and as Executive Assistant to the Vice Chief of Naval Operations. He also served as Executive Assistant and Senior Naval Aide to the Commander-in-Chief U.S. Pacific Fleet.

Crowder commanded the U.S. 7th Fleet from September 2006 to July 2008.  Prior to assuming that command, he was ADCNO for Information, Plans, and Strategy (OPNAV N3/N5B) in August 2005. His previous Flag assignments were as director of Deep Blue, the Navy Operations Group, from August 2002 to May 2004, director of Operations, Plans and Political Military Affairs Division (N31/N52) from September 2001-October 2002 — both on the staff of the Chief of Naval Operations. Additionally he served as commander of Carrier Strike Group Nine/Abraham Lincoln Strike Group from July 2004 to August 2005 deploying to the western Pacific and serving as commander of Combined Support Group Indonesia, as part of Operation Unified Assistance (Tsunami Relief effort).

Awards and honors

Vice Admiral Crowder was selected as an Olmsted Scholar and studied European Economic and Political Affairs at the University of Lausanne, Switzerland from 1980-82. In November 1982, he was awarded the Jean Monnet Medal for Leadership by the President of the French Senate in Paris.

Notes

External links

Official biography 
7th Fleet

1952 births
Living people
United States Naval Academy alumni
United States Navy vice admirals
Recipients of the Legion of Merit
Recipients of the Navy Distinguished Service Medal
Recipients of the Order of the Rising Sun